Statistics of Third Division Football Tournament in the 2017 season. Tournament started on November 1.

Teams
49 teams are competition in the 2017 Third Division Football Tournament, and these teams were divided into 9 groups of 4 teams, and 1 group with 3 teams, making up a total of 10 groups.

Group 1
Club Amigos
Dhivehi Sifainge Club
LQ Sports
Thimarafushi Friendly Players

Group 2
C.B.L
Bench
Confere
Falcon Sports Club

Group 3
Red Line Club
Lorenzo
Club All Youth Linkage
Sports Club Rivalsa

Group 4
Buru Sports
Super United Sports
Sea Land
College

Group 5
Police Club
U.N friends
Tent Sports Club
Rage

Group 6
Lagoons Sports Club
Gaamagu
Offu Football Club
Dhandu Goalhi

Group 7
Valiant Sports Club
Sent Sports Club
Zefro
Club Rock Street

Group 8
Dribbling Stars
Muiveyo Friends Club
Youth Revolution Club
Villimale United

Group 9
Sports Club Veloxia
Thulhaadhoo Aventures Sports
Kumundhoo
L.T Sports

Group 10
Sea Life
Lineage
The Bows

Group stage

All times listed are Maldives Standard Time.

Group 1

Group 2

Group 3

Group 4

Group 5

Group 6

Group 7

Group 8

Group 9

Group 10

Final

Awards

References

External links
 QF matchday 1 results at Sun Online
 SF matchday results at Sun Online
 Final matchday  result at Sun Online

Maldivian Third Division Football Tournament seasons
3